Remondini is an Italian surname, and may refer to:
 Remondini (firm), a firm of Italian print publishers run by a family of that name
 Leandro Remondini (1917–1979), an Italian soccer player and manager

See also 
 Peter Remondino
 Fabrizio Romondini